William Brangham (1968) is an American journalist who is currently a correspondent for the PBS NewsHour. Before, he worked as a producer for several other television programs, mostly for PBS. Awards he has won for his journalism include a Peabody Award in 2015 and News & Documentary Emmy Awards in 2017, 2019, and 2020.

Education and career 
Brangham studied English language and literature at Colorado College between 1986 and 1990, graduating with a Bachelor of Arts. He started his career as a research assistant and later as an associate producer and field producer for a number of Bill Moyers documentaries in the late 1990s and early 2000s. Those included Listening to America with Bill Moyers, Close to Home: Moyers on Addiction, and On Our Own Terms: Moyers on Dying in America. Additionally, Brangham worked on a variety of documentary films and projects for ABC News, National Geographic's Explorer series, several documentaries for PBS's Frontline (1995/1996), and The New York Times documentary series Science Times (2001).

After 9/11, Brangham re-joined Moyers' production company for the PBS newsmagazine Now, where he shot, wrote, and produced dozens of broadcast stories and interviews over a period of six years. After that, he was a producer on Bill Moyers Journal, when it was revived in 2007, and later joined the PBS magazine show Need to Know in 2010. Brangham was a producer, cameraman, and occasional correspondent on Need to Know for its entire run. Separately, he taught as an adjunct professor at the Columbia University Graduate School of Journalism for a year.

In June 2013, Brangham joined the weekend edition of PBS NewsHour as a producer, correspondent, and occasional substitute anchor. He reported across the U.S. and abroad, including reporting from Germany, Denmark, France, and Iran.  

In May 2015, Brangham left New York City to become a correspondent for the PBS NewsHour in Washington, D.C., reporting on general events, conducting studio interviews, and occasionally filling in as anchor of the program. 

Brangham's reporting on the Syrian refugee crisis in Europe was among the programs cited for the NewsHour's 2015 Peabody Award. 

In 2017, PBS NewsHour's six-part series "The End of AIDS?", of which Brangham was the correspondent, won a News & Documentary Emmy Award in the category "Outstanding Science, Medical and Environmental Report". That series also received several other awards, including the National Academies Communication Award in the category "Film/Radio/TV". 

In 2018, Brangham worked with several NewsHour colleagues on an investigation into rape, harassment, and retaliation within the U.S. Forest Service. That broadcast and online series, "On the Fire Line," prompted changes in how the Forest Service reports and investigates assault and harassment allegations and it led to the immediate resignation of the Chief of the U.S. Forest Service. This reporting won a 2019 News & Documentary Emmy Award for "Outstanding Investigative Report in a Newscast", won a Webby Award, was nominated for a Peabody, and won the 2018 Al Neuharth Innovation in Investigative Journalism Award.  

In 2019, Brangham and his NewsHour colleagues produced a three-part series called "Stopping a Killer Pandemic" which looked at U.S. preparations for a flu pandemic. That series won a 2020 News & Documentary Emmy Award for "Outstanding Science, Medical and Environmental Report."  (Brangham's and his colleague's multi-part series about climate change in Antarctica, "Warnings from Antarctica", was also nominated for an Emmy in that same category, and became the NewsHour's first originally-produced podcast series, "The Last Continent".)

Personal life 
Brangham is married to his wife Tory, and they have two sons and one daughter. He lives in the Washington, D.C. area.

See also 

 PBS NewsHour

References 

1968 births
21st-century American journalists
American television journalists
American television news producers
Colorado College alumni
Journalism teachers
Journalists from New York City
Living people
News & Documentary Emmy Award winners
PBS people
Peabody Award winners
Television producers from New York City